Mahmod Abdelaly (born March 11, 1967) is an Egyptian sport shooter. At age forty-one, Abdelaly made his official debut for the 2008 Summer Olympics in Beijing, where he competed in the men's 10 m air pistol. He finished only in forty-seventh place by two points ahead of Sri Lanka's Edirisinghe Senanayake, for a total score of 563 targets.

References

External links
 
 NBC Olympics Profile

Egyptian male sport shooters
Living people
Olympic shooters of Egypt
Shooters at the 2008 Summer Olympics
1967 births